Alexander Atwood (born October 9, 1949) is an American politician. He is a member of the Georgia House of Representatives from the 179th District, serving since 2010. He is a member of the Republican party.

References

Living people
Republican Party members of the Georgia House of Representatives
1949 births
Place of birth missing (living people)
21st-century American politicians